Subsampling or sub-sampling may refer to:
 Sampling (statistics)
 Replication (statistics)
 Downsampling in signal processing
 Chroma subsampling
 Sub-sampling (chemistry)